Jules Berry (born Marie Louis Jules Paufichet; 9 February 1883 – 23 April 1951) was a French actor.

Biography

Early life
Berry and his two brothers were born to parents who sold hardware and settled in Poitou.  The family moved to Paris in 1888.  Berry completed his studies at the Lycée Louis-le-Grand and then graduated from École nationale supérieure des Beaux-Arts.

Career
It was during his studies that Berry developed an interest in the theater.  Following an audition, he was hired by the Théâtre Antoine-Simone Berriau to act in La Mort du duc d'Enghien by Léon Hennique, and Le Perroquet vert by Arthur Schnitzler.

Later he performed at the Théâtre de l'Ambigu-Comique and the Théâtre de l'Athénée.  During a tour in Lyon, he was noticed by Jean-François Ponson, who hired him for a period of 12 years at the Théâtre royal des Galeries Saint-Hubert in Brussels.  Audiences in Brussels gave him a warm welcome, where he played in productions such as Le Mariage de mademoiselle Beulemans.

Berry subsequently performed in 30 successful plays for Marcel Achard, Alfred Savoir, Louis Verneuil, and Roger Ferdinand.  One of Berry's first movie roles was the silent film Oliver Cromwell (1911) directed by Henri Desfontaines.  His first appearance in a talking picture was Mon coeur et ses millions (1931) with Suzy Prim.  Over the course of his career, Berry acted in 89 motion pictures.

Bombastic, extravagant, and whimsical, Berry was as flamboyant as any entertainer of the period, including Pierre Brasseur.  Berry is often considered one of the greatest actors in the history of French cinema.

Among Berry's best films are: The Crime of Monsieur Lange by Jean Renoir, Les Visiteurs du Soir by Marcel Carné, Le Jour Se Lève by Marcel Carné, Strange Inheritance by Louis Daquin, Baccara by Yves Mirande, 27 Rue de la Paix by Richard Pottier and L'Habit vert by Roger Richebé.

Berry ended his film career in 1951 to interpret the texts of Jacques Prévert.

Personal life
Berry was romantically involved with actresses Jane Marken, Suzy Prim, and Josseline Gaël. He and Gaël had a daughter named Michelle in 1939.

A compulsive gambler, Berry frequented casinos and horse races. In April 1951, Berry was admitted to the Hôpital Broussais, where he died of a heart attack caused by treatment for rheumatism. He is buried in the Père Lachaise Cemetery (division 80).

Selected filmography
 L'argent (1928)
 King of the Hotel (1932)
 The Crime of Monsieur Lange (Le crime de Monsieur Lange, Jean Renoir, 1935)
 27 Rue de la Paix (1936)
 A Hen on a Wall (1936)
 Death on the Run (1936)
 The Green Jacket (1937)
 The Club of Aristocrats (1937)
 The Kings of Sport (1937)
 White Cargo (1937)
 Hercule (Alexander Esway, 1938)
 Café de Paris (1938)
 Crossroads (1938)
 The Woman Thief (1938)
 The West (1938)
 The Woman of Monte Carlo (1938)
 Le jour se lève (Marcel Carné, 1939)
 Behind the Facade (1939)
 His Uncle from Normandy (1939)
 The Mondesir Heir (1940)
 Paris-New York (1940)
 The Devil's Envoys (Les Visiteurs du Soir, Marcel Carné, 1942)
 The Murderer is Afraid at Night (1942)
 Sad Loves (1943)
 Marie-Martine (1943)
 The White Truck (1943)
 The Midnight Sun (1943)
 Strange Inheritance (1943)
 Behold Beatrice (1944)
 Dorothy Looks for Love (1945)
 The Murderer is Not Guilty (1946)
 Star Without Light (1946)
 Blonde (1950)
 Without Trumpet or Drum (1950)

References

External links

1883 births
1951 deaths
French male film actors
French male silent film actors
People from Poitiers
20th-century French male actors
Burials at Père Lachaise Cemetery